Rhaponticin is a stilbenoid glucoside compound. Its aglycone is called rhapontigenin. It can be found in rhubarb rhizomes.

It has beneficial effects on diabetic mice, and in vitro results suggest it may be relevant to Alzheimer's disease with an action on beta amyloid. It is a phytoestrogen and has estrogenic activity.

References 

Stilbenoid glycosides
Phenol glucosides